Cathy Cassidy (born 13 June 1962) is an English author of young adult fiction. She was born in Coventry, Warwickshire. For a number of years she lived near New Galloway in Scotland where she started writing her novels, but has since returned to England, where she now lives on The Wirral. She has written 30 books and a few e-books as well. She has also been the agony aunt for Shout, a magazine for teenage girls, and she presently has a series of four books about Daizy Star for younger readers and a series of books for older readers called the Chocolate Box Girls.

Personal life 
Cassidy now lives on The Wirral, Merseyside with her husband, Liam. She has two children Calum and Caitlin.  She has been a vegetarian for over 35 years and was a vegan for 8 years. Her lurcher, Kelpie, inspired the dog Legg-It in her first book. Cassidy was the agony aunt on teenage Shout magazine for 12 years and for many years taught art in local primary schools. She attended Liverpool Polytechnic, where she studied Illustration. She has drawn all of the illustrations and the front covers to all the Daizy Star books.

Awards and honors 
Cassidy has three times been nominated for the Queen of Teen award: in 2008 (when it was founded), 2010 and 2012. Award recipient have included Sarah Webb, Louise Rennison (the 2008 winner) and Sarra Manning. In 2010, fans voted Cassidy as the winner. In 2012, she was a runner up to Maureen Johnson.

Books 
List of Cathy Cassidy's books:
 Daizy Star
 Shine on, Daizy Star (2009)
 Daizy Star and the Pink Guitar (2010)
 Strike a Pose, Daizy Star (2011)
 Oh La La! Daizy Star (2012)

 Chocolate Box Girls
 Cherry Crush (2010)
 Marshmallow Skye (2011)
 Summer's Dream (2012)
 Coco Caramel (2013)
 Sweet Honey (2014)
 Fortune Cookie (2015)
 The Chocolate Box Secrets (2015)

 Bittersweet (2013)
 Chocolates and Flowers (2014)
 Hopes and Dreams (2014)
 Moon and Stars (2014)
 Life is Sweet (2015)
 Chocolate Box Girls Collection (omnibus) (2015)

 Lost and Found 
 Love from Lexie (2017)
 Sami's Silver Lining (2018)
 Sasha's Secret (2019)
 Forever Phoenix (2020)

 Novels
 Dizzy (2004)
 Indigo Blue (2005)
 Driftwood (2005)
 Scarlett (2006)
 Sundae Girl (2007)
 Lucky Star (2007)
 GingerSnaps (2008)
 Angel Cake (2009)
 Looking-Glass Girl (2015)
 The Broken Heart Club (2016)
 
 Omnibus
 Daizy Star and the Pink Guitar / Strike a Pose Daizy Star / Shine on Daizy Star / Her Evil Twin / This Totally Bites (2011) (with Mimi McCoy)
 
 Collections
 Our City (2008) (with John Fardell and Vivian French)
 
 Novellas
 Ice Cream and Dreams (2008)
 Snowflakes and Wishes (2014)
 
 Non fiction
 The Cathy Cassidy Dreams and Doodles Daybook (2008)
 Letters to Cathy (2009)

References

External links 
 
 Cathy Cassidy at Fantastic Fiction
 Audio interview with Cathy Cassidy (mp3 file, 20:36), December 2008
 Guardian interview

1962 births
Living people
21st-century English women writers
English women novelists
21st-century English novelists
British writers of young adult literature
English children's writers
Women writers of young adult literature
People from the Metropolitan Borough of Wirral
People from Coventry